The Frederick Youngman House was a historic home located in Kokomo, Indiana.  It was built in 1876, and was a two-story, Italianate style brick dwelling.  It featured a wide, bracketed wood cornice. It was destroyed by fire after being struck by lightning in June 1992.

It was added to the National Register of Historic Places in 1979 and delisted in 1993.

References

Kokomo, Indiana
Former National Register of Historic Places in Indiana
Houses on the National Register of Historic Places in Indiana
Italianate architecture in Indiana
Houses completed in 1876
National Register of Historic Places in Howard County, Indiana